The 1993 British Speedway Championship was the 33rd edition of the British Speedway Championship. The Final took place on 9 May at Brandon in Coventry, England. The Championship was won by Andy Smith, while Joe Screen won a run-off against Gary Havelock to finish second.

Final 
9 May 1993
 Brandon Stadium, Coventry

{| width=100%
|width=50% valign=top|

See also 
 British Speedway Championship
 1993 Individual Speedway World Championship

References 

British Speedway Championship
Great Britain